Zeeman may refer to:
"Zeeman (Je Verlangen Is De Zee)", Dutch rendering of the 1960-61 German-language hit single ""Seemann (Deine Heimat ist das Meer)" 
Zeeman (crater), a lunar impact crater located on the far side of the Moon near its south pole
Zeeman effect, the splitting of a spectral line into several components in the presence of a static magnetic field
Zeeman (store), a European clothing chain based in the Netherlands
Zeeman slower, a scientific apparatus that is commonly used in quantum optics to cool a beam of atoms from room temperature or above to a few kelvins
Zeeman (surname)

See also
Seeman (disambiguation)
Seemann (disambiguation)